Collombatti is a locality on the North Coast of New South Wales, Australia. The North Coast railway line passes through, and a station existed at the site between 1919 and 1974.

References 

 

Towns in New South Wales
Mid North Coast
North Coast railway line, New South Wales